Ghorpade Peth is an area located in Pune City, in Maharashtra State of the Republic of India.

References

Peths in Pune